The following is a list of episodes for the cartoon Donkey Kong Country. The series aired from August 15, 1997, to July 7, 2000 on Teletoon, France 2 and KidsCo.

It has been reported that there are two season numbering schemes that exist for the series that conflict with one another. Nelvana themselves have considered the series to not be made as two seasons, but rather they were set up as three cycles (13x13x14). This was used for the iTunes and Tubi streaming service releases. But when the series was officially released on DVD in North America, they were identified as two seasons. The first being made up of 26 episodes produced by MediaLab and the second season being made up of the 14 episodes produced by Hong Guang Animation. This Wikipedia page follows the two seasons scheme.

Series overview

Episodes

Season 1 (1997)

Season 2 (1999–2000)

References

External links
 

Lists of Canadian children's animated television series episodes
Lists of Chinese animated television series episodes
Lists of French animated television series episodes